Jakson Vicent Monasterio (born December 31, 1991) is a Venezuelan rower. He placed 29th in the men's single sculls event at the 2016 Summer Olympics.

References

1991 births
Living people
Venezuelan male rowers
Olympic rowers of Venezuela
Rowers at the 2016 Summer Olympics
Rowers at the 2015 Pan American Games
Pan American Games competitors for Venezuela
21st-century Venezuelan people